Sunny Isles Beach (SIB, officially the City of Sunny Isles Beach) is a city located on a barrier island in northeast Miami-Dade County, Florida, United States. The city is bounded by the Atlantic Ocean on the east and the Intracoastal Waterway on the west. As of the 2020 census, it had a population of 22,342.

Sunny Isles Beach is an area of cultural diversity with stores lining Collins Avenue, the main thoroughfare through the city. It is renowned for having the 14th tallest skyline in the United States despite its relatively low population.

It is a growing resort area, and developers like Michael Dezer have invested heavily in construction of high-rise hotels and condominiums while licensing the Donald Trump name for some of the buildings for promotional purposes. Sunny Isles Beach has a central location, minutes from Bal Harbour to the south, and Aventura to the north and west.

Sunny Isles Beach was the 2008 site of MTV's annual Spring Break celebration, with headquarters at the local Newport Beachside Resort.

History

In 1920, Harvey Baker Graves, a private investor, purchased a  tract of land for development as a tourist resort. He named it "Sunny Isles, the America Riviera".

When the Haulover bridge was completed in 1925, the area became accessible from Miami Beach, attracting developers who widened streams, dug canals and inlets and created islands and peninsulas for building waterfront properties on Biscayne Bay.

Sunny Isles Beach was known as North Miami Beach until 1931, then known as Sunny Isles until 1997.

In 1936, Milwaukee malt magnate Kurtis Froedtert bought Sunny Isles. The Sunny Isles Pier was built and soon became a popular destination. Sunny Isles developed slowly until the 1950s when the first single-family homes were built in the Golden Shores area. During the 1950s and 1960s more than 30 motels sprang up along Collins Avenue including the Ocean Palm, the first two-story motel in the U.S. Designed by Norman Giller in 1948 it was developed and owned by the Gingold family for the next 45 years and provided the springboard for Sunny Isles economic development. Tourists came from all over to vacation in themed motels of exotic design along "Motel Row". One motel, The Fountainhead, was named by its owner Norman Giller after the novel by Ayn Rand. As of 2013, the Ocean Palm Motel is closed.

In 1982 the half-mile-long Sunny Isles Pier was designated a historic site. In the early-mid 1980s, it went through restoration and re-opened to the public in 1986. The pier was damaged severely in October 2005 by Hurricane Wilma. After eight years, it was remodeled and reopened as Newport Fishing Pier on June 15, 2013.

In 1997, the citizens of the area voted to incorporate as a municipality. Sunny Isles was renamed Sunny Isles Beach. Sunny Isles Beach began major redevelopment during the real estate boom of the early 2000s with mostly high-rise condominiums and some hotels under construction along the beach side of Collins Avenue (A1A) replacing most of the historic one- and two-story motels along Motel Row. In 2011, construction began on two more high-rises, Regalia, located on the northern border of the city along A1A, and The Mansions at Acqualina, located adjacent to the Acqualina Resort & Spa on the Beach.

Geography
Sunny Isles Beach is located in northeastern Miami-Dade County at  (25.941270, –80.125111). It is bordered to the north by the town of Golden Beach, to the west across the Intracoastal Waterway by the cities of Aventura and North Miami Beach, to the south by Miami-Dade County's Haulover Park, and to the east by the Atlantic Ocean. 

Florida State Road A1A is the main road through the city, leading north  to Hollywood Beach and south  to the center of Miami Beach. State Road 826 (Sunny Isles Boulevard) leads west into North Miami Beach, and State Road 856 (the William Lehman Causeway) leads west into Aventura from the north end of Sunny Isles Beach.

Surrounding areas
 Golden Beach
 Aventura    Atlantic Ocean
 Aventura, North Miami Beach, North Miami   Atlantic Ocean
 North Miami    Atlantic Ocean
 Unincorporated Miami-Dade County (Haulover Park)

Demographics

2020 census

As of the 2020 United States census, there were 22,342 people, 10,487 households, and 5,713 families residing in the city.

2010 census
As of 2010, there were 18,984 households, out of which 46.1% were vacant. In 2000, 12.6% had children under the age of 18 living with them, 37.8% were married couples living together, 8.0% had a female householder with no husband present, and 51.1% were non-families. 43.9% of all households were made up of individuals, and 23.5% had someone living alone who was 65 years of age or older.  The average household size was 1.87 and the average family size was 2.55.

2000 census
In 2000, the city's population was spread out, with 11.3% under the age of 18, 5.4% from 18 to 24, 26.9% from 25 to 44, 24.3% from 45 to 64, and 32.2% who were 65 years of age or older.  The median age was 50 years. For every 100 females, there were 86.3 males.  For every 100 females age 18 and over, there were 83.6 males.

In 2000, the median income for a household in the city was $31,627, and the median income for a family was $40,309.  The per capita income for the city was $27,576.  About 11.2% of families and 14.7% of the population were below the poverty line, including 18.9% of those under age 18 and 12.2% of those age 65 or over.

As of 2000, Spanish was the mother tongue for 40.08%, while English was spoken by 36.86% of all residents. Living up to its nickname of "Little Moscow," 7.37% of the population had Russian as their first language. Other languages included French (4.08%), Yiddish (2.63%), Hebrew (2.42%), Portuguese (2.01%), Polish (1.38%), Hungarian (0.93%), Italian (0.69%), Arabic (0.66%), German (0.55%), and French Creole (0.35%).

Also, as of 2010, the six main ancestries of the population (excluding Hispanic ancestry) were 9.4% Russian, 5.8% Italian, 5.0% Polish, 4.9% American, 2.9% Irish, and 2.7% German.

Education
Sunny Isles Beach is within the Miami-Dade County Public Schools system.

All residents are zoned to Norman S. Edelcup/Sunny Isles Beach K–8 for elementary and K–8.

Prior to August 2008 residents were zoned to an elementary school as follows:
Ruth K. Broad/Bay Harbor Elementary School for residents south of 172nd Street
Ojus Elementary School for residents north of 172nd Street and south of 183rd Street
Highland Oaks Elementary School for residents north of 183rd Street

The Norman S. Edelcup/Sunny Isles Beach K–8, with four stories, is currently educating students from kindergarten through 8th grade from all of Sunny Isles Beach and Golden Beach as well as the Eastern Shores neighborhood of North Miami Beach. The school can hold up to 1,600 students. The school opened in August 2008 as a K–6, with grades 7 and 8 introduced in the subsequent two school years. The school has or is currently participating in: Accelerated Reader, VMath Live, mock elections, book drives, toy drives, etc. The school has state of the art technology that includes Smart Boards and surround sound microphones for both teachers and students. The school has Intracoastal and ocean views from almost every classroom on the 2nd, 3rd, 4th, and 5th floors. Sunny Isles Beach spent $12.5 million so the school district could buy the land. The anticipated 2008 enrollment of city residents in the school was about 900. It was originally known as Sunny Isles Beach Community School, but in 2011 a proposal came in to rename it after Mayor Norman S. Edelcup.

Residents who want a standard comprehensive middle school instead of a K–8 may choose to enroll at a separate middle school, Highland Oaks Middle School in an unincorporated area. Alonzo and Tracy Mourning Senior High Biscayne Bay Campus is the zoned senior high school. Prior to the opening of Mourning in 2009, Dr. Michael M. Krop Senior High School served Sunny Isles Beach. Sunny Isles Beach still lists Krop on its website.

Media

Sunny Isles Beach has its own newspaper, Sunny Isles Community News, published bi-weekly and part of Miami Community Newspapers. Sunny Isles Beach is also served by the Miami-Ft.Lauderdale market for local radio and television.

International relations

Twin towns – Sister cities
Sunny Isles Beach, Florida is twinned with:
 Netanya, Israel
 Taormina, Italy
 Punta del Este, Uruguay
 Hengchun, Taiwan

References

External links

 

Cities in Miami-Dade County, Florida
Beaches of Miami-Dade County, Florida
Russian communities in the United States
Populated places established in 1997
Cities in Florida
Jewish communities in the United States
Populated coastal places in Florida on the Atlantic Ocean
Former census-designated places in Florida
Cities in Miami metropolitan area
Beaches of Florida
1997 establishments in Florida